Mateo Tanlongo (born 12 August 2003) is an Argentine professional footballer who plays as a midfielder for Portuguese club Sporting CP.

Club career

Rosario Central
Tanlongo joined the youth system of Rosario Central in March 2010. After spending the next ten years in their academy, notably becoming the second youngest reserve debutant, the midfielder was promoted into the first-team by Kily González in mid-2020; having signed his first professional contract in June. A knee injury in October saw him miss two months. In January 2021, having gone unused on the bench versus Defensa y Justicia on 2 January, Tanlongo made his debut in the Copa de la Liga Profesional on 9 January in a loss away to Lanús; replacing Emmanuel Ojeda with seventeen minutes left, aged seventeen.

Sporting CP
On January 5, Tanlongo signed for Sporting CP on four-year contract on a free transfer.

International career
In 2019, Tanlongo was selected by the Argentina U16s by manager Pablo Aimar.

Career statistics
.

Notes

References

External links

2003 births
People from Rosario Department
Sportspeople from Santa Fe Province
Argentine people of Italian descent
Living people
Argentine footballers
Argentina youth international footballers
Association football midfielders
Rosario Central footballers
Sporting CP footballers
Argentine Primera División players
Primeira Liga players
Argentine expatriate footballers
Expatriate footballers in Portugal
Argentine expatriate sportspeople in Portugal